St George's Chapel, Windsor Castle is the place of worship at Windsor Castle in England.

St George's Chapel may also refer to:
St George's Chapel, Chatham, Medway, England
St. George's Chapel, Indian River, Delaware, USA
St. George's Chapel, Lewes, Delaware, USA